Warwick High School may refer to:

Warwick High School (Pennsylvania) in Lititz, Lancaster County, Pennsylvania
Warwick High School (Virginia) in Newport News, Virginia